Patrick Fay is an electrical engineer at the University of Notre Dame in South Bend, Indiana. Fay was named a Fellow of the Institute of Electrical and Electronics Engineers (IEEE) in 2016 for his contributions to compound semiconductor tunneling and high-speed device technologies''.

References 

Fellow Members of the IEEE
Living people
University of Notre Dame faculty
21st-century American engineers
Year of birth missing (living people)
American electrical engineers